Rear-Admiral William Moss Landymore, OBE, CD (31 July 1916–27 November 2008) was a Canadian naval officer. Born in Brantford, Ontario, Landymore joined the Royal Canadian Navy in 1936, but spent much of early career training with the Royal Navy. During World War II, Landymore returned to the Royal Canadian Navy and served aboard destroyers in the Battle of the Atlantic, surviving two sinkings. By the end of the war Landymore had taken a series of positions in Ottawa before returning to destroyer command during the Korean War. He was promoted through the ranks eventually becoming the first Commander of Maritime Command. :andymore became embroiled in a public feud with the Minister of National Defence following the Unification of the Canadian Armed Forces and resigned as a result. He died at Halifax, Nova Scotia.

Early career
Landymore joined the Royal Canadian Navy on 28 August 1936 where he commenced studies at the Royal Military College of Canada as cadet #2399. As a cadet, Landymore served aboard the Royal Navy training cruiser  before being sent to the light cruiser . He was commissioned into the Royal Canadian Navy as a midshipman on 1 May 1937 and promoted to acting sub-lieutenant on 1 March 1939.

Second World War
Landymore was posted to the C-class destroyer  in 1940 and survived her sinking after she collided with the cruiser  in the Gironde estuary. He was promoted to lieutenant on 1 November 1940 and served aboard the River-class destroyer  and survived her sinking. Landymore served on convoy escort missions in the Atlantic, Arctic, and Pacific Oceans, in the Second World War. He was promoted to acting lieutenant commander on 5 June 1944. He transferred Naval Service Headquarters (NSHQ) in Ottawa in 1944, as Director of Warfare and Training. Later in 1944, he returned to sea in the cruiser . In 1945, he returned to NSHQ as Staff Gunnery Officer.

Cold War
Landymore was promoted to the substantive rank of lieutenant-commander on 1 May 1947 and served as gunnery officer aboard HMCS Uganda, where he earned a Mention in Despatches (MID). He was then stationed as staff gunnery officer at Naval Service Headquarters in Ottawa. He was promoted to commander on 1 July 1949 and given command of the  destroyer , where he was awarded a second mention-in-despatches. He was promoted to acting captain on 14 June 1952. He commanded Iroquois for the duration of the Korean War from 21 October 1951 to 31 October 1953.

Landymore was promoted to the substantive rank of captain on 1 January 1953, and was posted to a variety of stations throughout the remainder of the 1950s, including the position of Commander Canadian Destroyers Far East when he was awarded the Order of the British Empire (OBE).  In 1958 Landymore was given command of the light aircraft carrier , the flagship of the east coast fleet.

He was promoted to commodore on 1 October 1959 and served as chief of staff to the Flag Officer Atlantic Coast, until 1962. He was promoted to rear-admiral on 1 November 1962 and served as Flag Officer Pacific Coast, from 1962 to 1964 and then as Flag Officer Atlantic Coast from 1964 to 1966. In January 1966 Landymore was appointed the first Commander of Maritime Command, and thus commander of all naval forces, as the position of Chief of the Naval Staff had been abolished in 1964.

Landymore became embroiled in "a bitter public disagreement" with the Minister of National Defence over the unification of the Royal Canadian Navy, Canadian Army, and Royal Canadian Air Force, to form the Canadian Armed Forces, and resigned from the RCN on 19 July 1966 (effective 5 April 1967). He died at Halifax, Nova Scotia in 2008.

Bruce Forsyth writes that Robert Caldwell wrote in his 2006 book The Admirals: Canada's Senior Naval Leadership in the Twentieth Century, that Landymore was "popular, admired by all ranks, and is remembered as being a forthright, four-square, hands-on commander and staff officer."

Honours

He was awarded an MID in the London Gazette of 1 January 1946 and Canada Gazette of 5 January, in recognition of his service to Uganda. He was awarded the Naval General Service Medal with Palestine bar for his service to Emerald for training during his Palestine campaign service in 1937. He was appointed an OBE and an MID for his Korean War service as commanding officer of Iroquois. In retirement, as Chairman of the Board of Grace Hospital Halifax, Nova Scotia he was awarded the Salvation Army Cross of the Order of Distinguished Auxiliary Service. He is a 2010 induction to the Wall of Honour at the Royal Military College of Canada.

Awards and decorations

Landymore's personal awards and decorations include the following:

x32px

x32px

115px

x32px

References

Notes

Further reading
 Burke, David P. "Hellyer and Landymore: The Unification of the Canadian Armed Forces and an Admiral's Revolt." American Review of Canadian Studies 8.2 (1978): 3-27.
 Milner, Marc. "Landymore, William Moss", in The Canadian Encyclopedia, Volume 2, p. 1173. Edmonton: Hurtig Publishers, 1988.
 Ross, Richard G. "A Paradigm in Defense Organization: Unification of the Canadian Armed Forces" ARMY LOGISTICS MANAGEMENT CENTER FORT LEE VA, 1968 online.

External links
Obituary from Toronto Globe and Mail. Describes debate re unification of Canadian armed forces
Remembrances of two Canadian naval officers who knew Landymore (from Toronto Globe and Mail)
Tribute in the Senate by Hon. Bill Rompkey
Canada's 25 Most Renowned Military Leaders

1916 births
2008 deaths
Canadian military personnel from Ontario
People from Brantford
Canadian admirals
Royal Canadian Navy officers
Royal Canadian Navy personnel of World War II
Royal Military College of Canada alumni
Canadian Officers of the Order of the British Empire
Commanders of the Royal Canadian Navy